Hayden Matthew Morton (born 2 March 1994) is an Australian professional football (soccer) player who plays as a defender for Sutherland Sharks in the National Premier Leagues.

Morton played youth football with the Mariners before making his professional debut for the club in 2012. He has also played for Sutherlands Sharks.

Morton has appeared for the Australia U17 and U20 teams.

Playing career

Club
Morton made his debut for the Central Coast Mariners in a one goal defeat against Sydney FC late in 2012. Early in 2013 he signed a two year professional contract with the Mariners, keeping him at the club until 2015. He made a second Mariners appearance in March 2013 as a substitute in a 2-1 win over Melbourne Heart. He made his third competitive appearance for the Mariners starting in a 2013 AFC Champions League loss to Guizhou Renhe.

Morton's next Mariners appearance was a win in the 2014 FFA Cup quarter-finals over Palm Beach.

Morton enjoyed a run of first-team appearances in early 2015, with regular right-backs Jacob Poscoliero injured and Storm Roux on international duty with New Zealand.

International
Morton was first called into the Young Socceroos squad for the AFF U-19 Youth Championship. He went on to play for the side at the 2012 AFC U-19 Championship, reaching the semi-finals and so qualifying for the 2013 FIFA U-20 World Cup.

Honours

Club
Sutherland Sharks
Waratah Cup: 2012

Central Coast Mariners
A-League Championship: 2012-13

References 

Living people
1994 births
Association football defenders
Australia youth international soccer players
Australia under-20 international soccer players
Australian soccer players
A-League Men players
Central Coast Mariners FC players
Sutherland Sharks FC players
Wollongong Wolves FC players
Wollongong United FC players